East High School is a comprehensive high school located at 1924 Van Brunt Boulevard in Kansas City, Missouri. It is part of the Kansas City Public Schools.

Background
East High School opened in 1925. During the 2007-2008 school year East Elementary School was housed at East High School, serving grades K-8.

The following year, East was reestablished after the voters of Kansas City and Independence voted for seven schools to be given to the Independence Public School District, including Van Horn High School, which previously served residents of eastern portions of the KCMO School District within the city of Kansas City, Missouri.

Annexation boundary line debate
In November 2007, the voters of Independence Public School District and Kansas City Public Schools voted for seven schools (Van Horn High School, one middle school, and five elementary schools) to be taken over by the Independence School District.

Notable alumni
Gene Roberts, football running back for the New York Giants

References

External links

 East High School website

High schools in Kansas City, Missouri
Educational institutions established in 1925
Public high schools in Missouri
Public middle schools in Missouri
1925 establishments in Missouri